Yanni Gourde (born December 15, 1991) is a Canadian professional ice hockey forward and alternate captain for the Seattle Kraken of the National Hockey League (NHL). An undrafted player, Gourde signed with the Tampa Bay Lightning as a free agent in 2014. Gourde won back-to-back Stanley Cups with the Lightning in 2020 and 2021.

Playing career

Youth
As a youth, Gourde played in the 2003, 2004 and 2005 Quebec International Pee-Wee Hockey Tournaments with a minor ice hockey team from south shore of Quebec City.

Juniors
Undrafted, Gourde played major junior in the Quebec Major Junior Hockey League (QMJHL) with the Victoriaville Tigres. He won the QMJHL's top scoring award as well as the league MVP in 2011–12 after compiling an impressive 87 assists and 124 points in 68 games.

Tampa Bay Lightning
On March 10, 2014, Gourde agreed to a one-year American Hockey League (AHL) contract with the Syracuse Crunch and a two-year entry level contract with their NHL affiliate, the Tampa Bay Lightning, to begin in the 2014–15 season. He responded to surprisingly lead the Crunch in goals scored with 29, including a team-leading eight on the powerplay. He completed his break-out season with 57 points in 76 games.

Gourde was returned to the Crunch after competing in the Lightning's training camp to begin the 2015–16 season. He continued his scoring pace from the previous season and placed third amongst the team points when he received his first NHL recall to the Lightning on December 14, 2015.

On December 14, 2015, the Lightning recalled Gourde along with teammate Joël Vermin. On December 15, 2015, Gourde made his NHL debut in a 5–4 overtime Lightning win over the Toronto Maple Leafs. Gourde also registered his first career NHL assist and point on a Mike Blunden goal.

On July 25, 2016, the Lightning announced the re-signing of Gourde to a one-year, two-way contract. Gourde appeared in two games the previous season, recording an assist and two penalty minutes. He also played in 65 games with the Crunch, recording 14 goals and 44 points.

On March 11, 2017, Gourde scored his first NHL goal, against the Florida Panthers, shorthanded on the penalty kill. In so doing, Gourde became the fourth Lightning player to score their first career goal shorthanded.

On June 26, 2017, the Lightning announced it had re-signed Gourde to a two-year, $2 million contract extension.

During the 2017–18 season Gourde was named the NHL Rookie of the Month for February. On March 6, 2018, Gourde recorded two goals in a 5-4 overtime Lightning victory over the visiting Florida Panthers. His two goal effort tied him with Tyler Johnson for the most goals during a rookie season by a Lightning player. On March 30, 2018, Gourde moved past Ondřej Palát (59) for second most points in a season by a Lightning rookie. On April 6, Gourde recorded one goal and two assists in a 7–5 Lightning victory over the visiting Buffalo Sabres. The goal moved Gourde past Tyler Johnson for most goals by a Lightning rookie, with 25. Gourde also passed Brad Richards for the most points in a season by a Lightning rookie, with 64. On April 12, Gourde made his Stanley Cup playoff debut in a 5–2 Lightning home win against the New Jersey Devils. He recorded his first career playoff goal, assist and point in the Lightning victory, becoming only the second player in Lightning history to have a multi-point game in their playoff debut.

On November 2, 2018, the Lightning signed Gourde to a six-year, $31 million contract extension. On March 22, 2019, Gourde was suspended for two games for an illegal check to the head of Carolina Hurricanes' forward Jordan Staal at PNC Arena the previous night.

Seattle Kraken
On July 21, 2021, Gourde was selected from the Lightning at the 2021 NHL Expansion Draft by the Seattle Kraken Expansion draft.

Personal life
Gourde was named after the Greek composer Yanni. His parents saw the artist's name in the credits of a movie they had watched while his mother was pregnant with him, which resulted in them deciding to give him the first name Yanni.

Gourde and his wife Marie-Andrée had their first child on May 1, 2018.

Career statistics

Awards and honours

Records
 Most points by a Tampa Bay Lightning rookie, 64 (2017–18)
 Most goals by a Tampa Bay Lightning rookie, 25 (2017–18)

References

External links

1991 births
Living people
Canadian ice hockey left wingers
French Quebecers
Ice hockey people from Quebec
Kalamazoo Wings (ECHL) players
People from Mauricie
San Francisco Bulls players
Seattle Kraken players
Stanley Cup champions
Syracuse Crunch players
Tampa Bay Lightning players
Undrafted National Hockey League players
Victoriaville Tigres players
Worcester Sharks players